Double disk or double-disk may refer to:

Double album, a double CD album
Double Album (NOFX Album), 2022
Double-disk diffusion test
Vertisoft DoubleDisk, a DOS disk compression software by Vertisoft